Queens of Clubs Trilogy: Onyx Edition is the second installment in the Queen of Clubs Trilogy: The Best of Nadia Ali Remixed, a compilation of remixes of  tracks by Libyan-born American singer-songwriter Nadia Ali. The album was released on October 28, 2010 by Smile in Bed Records.

Track listing

Credits
Track 7: Collaboration with Chris Reece
Track 16: Collaboration with Dresden & Johnston
Track 17: Collaboration with Creamer & K and Rosko
Track 18: Collaboration with Serge Devant

References

External links
Queen of Clubs Trilogy: Onyx Edition at discogs
Queen of Clubs Trilogy: Onyx Edition at iTunes

2010 compilation albums
Nadia Ali (singer) albums